Thukkaram is a 1938 Indian Tamil-language biographical film directed by B. N. Rao and produced by Central Studios in Coimbatore. The film featured Carnatic vocalist Musiri Subramania Iyer as the eponymous saint.

Plot
The film depicts the life story of the saint Tukaram.

Cast
Musiri Subramania Iyer as Tukaram
K. Sarangapani
R. Balasubramaniam
M. S. Murugesan
K. A. Chokkalinga Bhagavathar
K. Seetha
Meenambal
R. Balasaraswathi as Tukaram's daughter

Production
This is the only film that Musiri Subramania Iyer had any stint in the celluloid world. According to writer and critic Kalki Krishnamurthy, during the shooting of the film, Tukaram wore a moustache whereas Subramania Iyer had a clean shaved face. When he was acting the part, an artificial moustache was fixed on his face. Subramania Iyer could not bear the itching caused by the gum that held the moustache under his nose. He told the producers to wait for sometime until he grew his own moustache. It was a scene of merriment to see him sporting a moustache because basically he was a Carnatic singer and in those days it was considered a taboo for them to wear a moustache. However, the very next moment shooting was over, Subramania Iyer got a clean shave done.

R. Balasaraswathi who became a popular playback singer in later years, appeared as a child artiste, playing the role of Tukkaram's daughter. The film was produced also in Telugu with C. S. R. Anjaneyulu playing the title role.

Soundtrack
Although no print of the film has survived, making it a lost film, some song discs of the film were still available as of January 2008.

Reception
Thukkaram was a commercial success, prompting B. N. Rao to make more films with Central Studios.

References

1938 films
Tamil films remade in other languages
Hindu devotional films
Indian biographical films
Films about classical music and musicians
Lost Indian films
1930s biographical films
Indian black-and-white films
1938 lost films
Films scored by B. N. Rao